Tone letters are letters that represent the tones of a language, most commonly in languages with contour tones.


Chao tone letters (IPA)

A series of iconic tone letters based on a musical staff was devised by Yuen Ren Chao in the 1920s by adding a reference stave to the existing convention of the International Phonetic Alphabet. The stave was adopted by the IPA as an option in 1989 and is now nearly universal. When the contours had been drawn without a staff, it was difficult to discern subtle distinction in pitch. Only nine or so of the possible tones were commonly distinguished: high, medium and low level,  (or as dots rather than macrons for 'unaccented' tones); high rising and falling, ; low rising and falling, ; and peaking and dipping, though more precise notation was found and the IPA specifically provided for mid rising and falling tones if needed. The Chao tone letters were originally x-height, but are now taller to make distinctions in pitch more visible. 

Combinations of the Chao tone letters form schematics of the pitch contour of a tone, mapping the pitch in the letter space and ending in a vertical bar. For example,  represents the mid-dipping pitch contour of the Chinese word for horse, ／ mǎ. Single tone letters differentiate up to five pitch levels:  'extra high' or 'top',  'high',  'mid',  'low', and  'extra low' or 'bottom'. No language is known to depend on more than five levels of pitch.

These letters are most commonly written at the end of a syllable. For example, Standard Mandarin has the following four tones in syllables spoken in isolation:

For languages that have simple register tones in basic morphemes, or on short vowels, single tone letters are used for these, and the tone letters combine as the tones themselves do to form contours. For example, Yoruba has the three basic tones  on short vowels and the six derived contour tones  on long vowels, diphthongs and contractions. On the other hand, for languages that have basic contour tones, and among these are level tones, it's a common convention to use double tone letters for those level tones, and single tone letters for short checked tones, as in Taiwanese Hokkien  vs . Regardless, this is not an IPA convention.

Chao tone letters are sometimes written before the syllable, in accordance with writing stress and downstep before the syllable, and as had been done with the unstaffed letters in the IPA before 1989. For example, the following passage transcribes the prosody of European Portuguese using tone letters alongside stress, upstep, and downstep in the same position before the syllable:

 

The two systems may be combined, with prosodic pitch written before a word or syllable and lexical tone after a word or syllable, since in the Sinological tradition the tone letters following a syllable are always purely lexical and disregard prosody. 

Diacritics may also be used to transcribe tone in the IPA. For example, tone 3 in Mandarin is a low tone between other syllables, and can be represented as such phonemically. The four Mandarin tones can therefore be transcribed . (These diacritics conflict with the conventions of Pinyin, which uses the pre-Kiel IPA diacritic conventions: , respectively)

Reversed Chao tone letters
Reversed Chao tone letters indicate tone sandhi, with the right-stem letters on the left for the underlying tone, and left-stem ('reversed') letters on the right for the surface tone. For example, the Mandarin phrase nǐ  + hǎo  > ní hǎo  is transcribed:

Some transcribers use reversed tone letters to show that they apply to the following rather than the preceding syllable. For example, Kyoto Japanese ame 'rain' may be transcribed,

Reversed tone letters were adopted by the IPA in 1989, though they do not appear in the space-limited IPA chart.

The phonetic realization of neutral tones are sometimes indicated by replacing the horizontal stroke with a dot: . When combined with tone sandhi, the same letters may have the stem on the left: . This is an extension of the pre-Kiel IPA convention of a dot placed at various heights to indicate the pitch of a reduced tone. 

Chao defined the pitch trace as indicating a 'toneme' when to the left of the stave, and as a 'tone value' when to the right. However, 'tone value' is not precisely defined, and in his examples may be phonemic. His illustrations use left- and right-facing tone letters as follows: 
 English  etc: different intonations of the response 'yes'
 Cantonese : a phonemic change in tone due to sandhi in a compound word
 Lhasa Tibetan  > : the spread of an underlying peaking tone on kɑ across adjacent syllables
The Tibetan distinction is a phonemic-phonetic one; the Cantonese distinction is not.

Capital-letter abbreviations 
An abstract representation of relatively simple tone is often indicated with capital letters: H 'high', M 'mid', and L 'low'. A falling tone is then HM, HL, ML or more generally F, and a rising tone LM, MH, LH or more generally R. These may be presented by themselves (e.g. a rule H + M → F, or a word tone such as LL [two low-tone syllables]), or in combination with a CV transcription (e.g. a high-tone syllable  etc.).

Numerical values 
Tone letters are often transliterated as digits, particularly in Asian and Mesoamerican tone languages. Until the spread of OpenType computer fonts starting in 2000–2001, tone letters were not practical for many applications. A numerical substitute has been commonly used for tone contours, with a numerical value assigned to the beginning, end, and sometimes middle of the contour. For example, the four Mandarin tones are commonly transcribed as "ma55", "ma35", "ma214", "ma51".

However, such numerical systems are ambiguous. In Asian languages such as Chinese, convention assigns the lowest pitch a 1 and the highest a 5. Conversely, in Africa the lowest pitch is assigned a 5 and the highest a 1, barring a few exceptional cases with six tone levels, which may have the opposite convention of 1 being low and 6 being high. In the case of Mesoamerican languages, the highest pitch may be 1 but the lowest depends on the number of contrastive pitch levels in the language being transcribed. For example, an Otomanguean language with three level tones may denote them as 1 (high ), 2 (mid ) and 3 (low ). (Three-tone systems occur in Mixtecan, Chinantecan and Amuzgoan languages.) A reader accustomed to Chinese usage will misinterpret the Mixtec low tone as mid, and the high tone as low. In Chatino, 0 is high and 4 is low. Because Chao tone letters are iconic, and musical staves are internationally recognized with high pitch at the top and low pitch at the bottom, tone letters do not suffer from this ambiguity.

Division of tone space 
The International Phonetic Association suggests using the tone letters to represent phonemic contrasts.

For the purposes of a precise linguistic analysis there are at least three approaches: linear, exponential, and language-specific. A linear approach is to map the tone levels directly to fundamental frequency (f0), by subtracting the tone with lowest f0 from the tone with highest f0, and dividing this space into four equal f0 intervals. Tone letters are then chosen based on the f0 tone contours over this region. This linear approach is systematic, but it does not always align the beginning and end of each tone with the proposed tone levels. Chao's earlier description of the tone levels is an exponential approach. Chao proposed five tone levels, where each level is spaced two semitones apart. A later description provides only one semitone between levels 1 and 2, and three semitones between levels 2 and 3. This updated description may be a language-specific division of the tone space.

IPA tone letters in Unicode 

In Unicode, the IPA tone letters are encoded as follows:
Standard staved tone letters
 
 
 
 
 
Reversed tone letters
 
 
 
 
 

These are combined in sequence for contour tones. 

The dotted tone letters are: 

Dotted tone letters
 
 
 
 
 
Reversed dotted tone letters
 
 
 
 
 

Although not defined specifically as IPA, many of the IPA staveless tone letters (or at least approximations of them, depending on the font) are available in Unicode:

Default or high staveless tone letters
 
 
 
 
 
 
 
Mid staveless tone letters
 
 
 
 
 
Low staveless tone letters

Non-IPA systems 
Although the phrase "tone letter" generally refers to the Chao system in the context of the IPA, there are also orthographies with letters assigned to individual tones, which may also be called tone letters.

UPA
The Uralic Phonetic Alphabet has marks resembling half brackets that indicate the beginning and end of high and low tone: , also ꜠ high-pitch stress, ꜡ low-pitch stress.

Chinese

Besides phonemic tone systems, Chinese is commonly transcribed with four to eight historical tone categories. A mark is placed at a corner of a syllable for its category. 

 yin tones: ꜀píng, ꜂shǎng, qù꜄, ruʔ꜆ 
 yang tones: ꜁píng, ꜃shǎng, qù꜅, ruʔ꜇

When the yin–yang distinction is not needed, the yin tone marks are used.

See also bopomofo.

Zhuang
In several systems, tone numbers are integrated into the orthography and so they are technically letters even though they continue to be called "numbers". However, in the case of Zhuang, the 1957 Chinese orthography modified the digits to make them graphically distinct from digits used numerically.

Hmong and Unified Miao
The Hmong Romanized Popular Alphabet was devised in the early 1950s with Latin tone letters. Two of the 'tones' are more accurately called register, as tone is not their distinguishing feature. Several of the letters pull double duty representing consonants.

(The low-rising creaky register is a phrase-final allophone of the low-falling register.)

A unified Miao alphabet used in China applies a different scheme:

Chatino
In Highland Chatino, superscript capital A–L are used as tone letters: .

Chinantec
Several ways of transcribing Chinantec tone have been developed. Linguists typically use superscripted numbers or IPA. 

Ozumacín Chinantec uses the following diacritics:

. 

Sample: Jnäꜘ Paaˊ naˉhña̱a̱nˊ la̱a̱nˈ apóstol kya̱a̱ꜗ Jesucristo läꜙ hyohˉ dsëꜗ Dio. Ko̱ˉjø̱hꜘ kya̱a̱hˊ Sóstene ø̱ø̱hꜗ jneˊ.

Korean
In Korean,  〮 and  〯 are used for historical vowel length and pitch accent.

Lahu and Akha

The related Lahu and Akha use the following spacing diacritic marks:

aˆ aˇ aˉ aˍ aꞈ aˬ.

Sample: Ngaˬ ˗ahˇ hawˬ maˬ mehꞈ nya si ...

See also 
 Tone (linguistics)#Phonetic notation
 Thai alphabet#Tone
 Tone (linguistics)
 Tone contour
 Tone number
 Tone name
 Tone (disambiguation)
 Four tones (Middle Chinese) for traditional Chinese notation

Notes

References

 
 
 
 
  (Ph.D. Dissertation)
 
 
 

Phonology
Tone (linguistics)
Writing systems